"Without You" is a song by Australian rock band Silverchair, released as the second single from their fourth album, Diorama (2002), on 13 May 2002. It was written by lead singer-guitarist Daniel Johns and was composed during the recording sessions for the band's third album Neon Ballroom (1999) but was not used at that time.

The video is composed of many colourful auroras and seems to be in a space setting. It can be noted that Daniel Johns was sitting in a chair for a few shots. During the period in which this video was shot, Johns' reactive arthritis was worsening, and he could barely walk let alone play a guitar.

Background
In June 2001, Silverchair entered a studio in Sydney with producer David Bottrill (Tool, Peter Gabriel, King Crimson) to start work on their fourth album, Diorama, which includes the track, "Without You". Lead singer-guitarist Daniel Johns wrote the song and formally assumed the role of a co-producer.

Early in December, the first single, "The Greatest View", was released to Australian radio networks. Early in 2002, Johns was diagnosed with reactive arthritis which made it difficult for him to play the guitar and subsequent performances supporting the album's release were cancelled. In March, Diorama was issued and topped the ARIA Albums Chart – it became their fourth  1 album and spent 50 weeks in the top 50.

"Without You" was released on 13 May 2002 and reached No. 8 on the Australian ARIA Singles Chart. In October, Silverchair were successful at the ARIA Music Awards of 2002, winning five awards including Best Rock Album, Best Group, and Producer of the Year for Johns. The band played "The Greatest View" at the ceremony: the song was also nominated for 'Best Video'. Two singles (and a related video) were nominated for further ARIA Awards in 2003.

Track listing
Australian CD single (ELEVENCD9)
 "Without You"
 "Asylum"
 "Hollywood"
 "Ramble"

Charts

References

2002 singles
2002 songs
Eleven: A Music Company singles
Silverchair songs
Song recordings produced by David Bottrill
Songs written by Daniel Johns
Virgin Records singles